The Haruna-class destroyer was a destroyer class built for the Japan Maritime Self-Defense Force (JMSDF) in the early 1970s. These helicopter carrying destroyers (DDH) are built around a large central hangar which houses up to three helicopters.

Originally, the Coastal Safety Force and its successor, the JMSDF, had intended to enable its fleet aviation operating capability. In 1960, the Defense Agency planned to construct one helicopter carrier (CVH) with the Second Defense Build-up Plan, but this project was shelved and finally cancelled because the JMSDF changed their plan to dispersing its fleet aviation assets among destroyers, not concentrating in a few helicopter carriers. The Japanese DDH was planned to be a hub with this dispersing fleet aviation concept with their logistics service capability for aircraft.

At the beginning, equipment of this class were similar to those of the  DDA. All weapons, two 5-inch/54 caliber Mark 42 (Type 73) guns and one Type 74 octuple missile launcher (Japanese version of the American Mark 16 GMLS), were settled on the forecastle deck. But with the Fleet Rehabilitation and Modernization (FRAM) program in 1983 and 1984, Sea Sparrow launchers, Phalanx CIWS systems and chaff launchers were added on the superstructure. With this upgrading program, this class became also enable to operate Naval Tactical Data System (NTDS)  with OYQ-6/7 combat direction system.

The rear-half of the superstructure was helicopter hangar, and the afterdeck was the helicopter deck with the beartrap system. To operate large HSS-2 ASW helicopters safely, the full length of the helicopter deck reached 50 meters.

Ships in the class

Gallery

References

External links

GlobalSecurity.org; JMSDF DDH Haruna Class

 

Destroyer classes